Jolanta Kajtoch (née Wójcik; born 2 June 1984 in Lipinki, Świecie County) is a Polish sprinter, who specialized in the 400 metres. Wojcik competed for the women's 4 × 400 m relay at the 2008 Summer Olympics in Beijing, along with her teammates Grażyna Prokopek, Anna Jesień, and Monika Bejnar. She ran on the second leg of the first heat, with an individual-split time of 51.72 seconds. Wojcik and her team finished the relay in sixth place for a total time of 3:28.23, failing to advance into the final.

References

External links

NBC 2008 Olympics profile

1985 births
Living people
Polish female sprinters
Olympic athletes of Poland
Athletes (track and field) at the 2008 Summer Olympics
People from Świecie County
Sportspeople from Kuyavian-Pomeranian Voivodeship